Titak (also Romanized as Tītak; also known as Tītaq and Tūtak) is a village in Saheli-ye Jokandan Rural District, in the Central District of Talesh County, Gilan Province, Iran. At the 2006 census, its population was 1,022, in 246 families.

References 

Populated places in Talesh County